BareMetal is an exokernel-based single address space operating system (OS) created by Return Infinity.

It is written in assembly to achieve high-performance computing with minimal footprint with a "just enough operating system" (JeOS) approach. The operating system is primarily targeted towards virtualized environments for cloud computing, or HPCs due to its design as a lightweight kernel (LWK). It could be used as a unikernel.

It was inspired by another OS written in assembly, MikeOS, and it is a recent example of an operating system that is not written in C or C++, nor based on Unix-like kernels.

Overview

Hardware requirements 
 AMD/Intel based 64-bit computer
 Memory: 4 MB (plus 2 MB for every additional core)
 Hard Disk: 32 MB

One task per core 
Multitasking on BareMetal is unusual for modern operating systems. BareMetal uses an internal work queue that all CPU cores poll. A task added to the work queue will be processed by any available CPU core in the system and will execute until completion, which results in no context switch overhead.

Programming

API 
An API is documented but, in line with its philosophy, the OS does not enforce entry points for system calls (e.g.: no call gates or other safety mechanisms).

C 
BareMetal OS has a build script to pull the latest code, make the needed changes, and then compile C code using the Newlib C standard library.

C++ 
A mostly-complete C++11 Standard Library was designed and developed for working in ring 0. The main goal of such library is providing, on a library level, an alternative to hardware memory protection used in classical OSes, with help of carefully designed classes.

Rust 
A Rust program demonstration was added to the programs in November 2014, demonstrating the ability to write Rust programs for BareMetal OS.

Networking

TCP/IP stack 
A TCP/IP stack was the #1 feature request. A port of lwIP written in C was announced in October 2014.

minIP, a minimalist IP stack in ANSI C able to provide enough functionalities to serve a simple static webpage, is being developed as a proof of concept to learn the fundamentals in preparation for an x86-64 assembly re-write planned for the future.

References

External links 
 
 BareMetal OS Google Group discussion forum

Free software operating systems
Hobbyist operating systems
Microkernels
Software using the BSD license
Assembly language software